, also known as Ogawa Kazuma or Ogawa Isshin, was a Japanese photographer, printer and publisher who was a pioneer in photomechanical printing and photography in the Meiji era.

Life
Ogawa was born in Saitama to the Matsudaira samurai clan. He started studying English and photography at the age of 15 under Yoshiwara Hideo, then in 1880 he moved to Tokyo in order to further hone his English language skills. One year later, Ogawa was hired as an interpreter in the Yokohama Police Department, while learning photography from Shimooka Renjō in Yokohama.

In 1882, he moved to Boston where he took courses in portrait photography and the dry plate process. He also studied collotype printing in Albert Type Company.

Upon his return to Japan in 1884, Ogawa opened a photographic studio in Iidabashi (Kōjimachi), the first in Tokyo. Four years later, he established the Tsukiji Kampan Seizō Kaisha ( Tsukiji dry plate manufacturing company), which manufactured dry plates for use by photographers. In 1889, he set up Japan's first collotype business, the Ogawa Shashin Seihan jo, also referred to as the K. Ogawa printing factory. In the same year, Ogawa worked as an editor for Shashin Shinpō (lit. Photography journal), the only photographic journal available at the time, as well as for Kokka magazine (lit. National flower). He printed both magazines using the collotype printing process.
 
Ogawa was a founding member of the Japan Photographic Society, which gathered photography amateurs from all around Japan. In 1891, he was charged with taking 100 pictures of Tokyo's most attractive geisha, to commemorate the opening of the Ryōunkaku.

In 1894 he met the writer Alicia Little who was visiting Japan from her home in China. She was already a published author and she had a diary that she had written. Ogawa supplied photographs and it was published as My Diary in a Chinese Farm. The book described their stay on a farm near the Yangtse River as they avoided the summer heat at their home in Chingqing.

Notes

External links

 A biographical timeline of Ogawa Kazumasa
A selection of pictures taken by Ogawa
Flower collotypes by Ogawa
Bachmann Eckenstein Art & Antiques, "Ogawa Kazuma" (Asia through the Lens). Accessed 20 January 2007.
QUT Digital Collections 

1860 births
1929 deaths
Japanese photographers
Imperial household artists